Guynn is a surname. Notable people with the surname include:

Jack Guynn (born 1943), American economist
Randall D. Guynn (born 1957), American lawyer

See also
Gunn (surname)

Surnames of French origin
Surnames of Welsh origin